The Cincinnati Jungle Kats were an arena football team based in Cincinnati. The Jungle Kats were members of the Midwest Division of the American Conference of AF2. The Jungle Kats played its home games at the U.S. Bank Arena. Their only year in existence was 2007. The team is not to be confused with the Marshals (formerly the Cincinnati Marshals), the NIFL club that was the arena's former tenant, who changed their name to "The Marshals" and moved to Hara Arena in nearby Dayton, Ohio for the 2007 season.

The team name was in reference to the city's NFL team, the Cincinnati Bengals and a tribute to the Cincinnati Zoo's tiger conservation efforts. Former Bengals defensive tackle Sam Adams, Cincinnati Reds right fielder Ken Griffey Jr., and Cincinnati Reds medical director Dr. Timothy Kremchek were the principal owners.

Tony Missick was the team's only head coach.  The rest of the coaching staff included Ron Hill, Daniel James, Matt Braun, and Lamont Watson.

The team dissolved in November 2007 after completing one season.

Roster

Coaches of note

Head coaches
Note: Statistics are correct through the end of the 2007 AF2 season.

Coaching staff

Season-By-Season

References

External links
Cincinnati Jungle Kats at ArenaFan.com

American football teams in Cincinnati
American football teams in Ohio
Defunct af2 teams
Defunct American football teams in Ohio
American football teams established in 2006
American football teams disestablished in 2007
2006 establishments in Ohio
2007 disestablishments in Ohio